Chilakamma Cheppindi is a 1977 Indian Telugu-language drama film, written and directed by Eranki Sharma. The film starred Rajinikanth in his first lead role. The film won the state Nandi Award for Best Feature Film. The film was a remake of the 1969 Malayalam film Adimakal. The film was remade in Tamil as Nizhal Nijamagirathu by K.Balachander. The film was premiered at the 1978 International Film Festival of India.

Plot 
Ravi, an executive, arrives in a small town in Andhra Pradesh on a temporary assignment. His friend Madhu helps him find accommodation opposite his own house. Ravi is a cocksure character who immediately rubs Madhu's sister Bharati, a dance teacher, the wrong way with his brash behaviour. Bharati hates men because of a past incident. Malli is the domestic help in Madhu's house. Madhu seduces and impregnates her, but denies paternity. In parallel, Ravi tries to tame the shrewish Bharati. Eventually, Malli's problems are all solved with Ravi's help and Bharati too responds to his advances.

Cast 
 Rajinikanth as Ravi
 Sangeetha as Bharati
 Sripriya as Malli
 Lakshmikanth as Madhu

Soundtrack 

 "Chitti Chitti Chepallara Selayeti Papallara Chialakamma Cheppindoyi Challanimata" (P. Susheela)
 "Enduku Neekee Daaparikamu Ennallu Daastavu Daagani Nijamu" (S. P. Balasubrahmanyam, Vani Jairam)
 "Kurradanukoni Kunukuluteese Verridanikee Pilupu" (S. P. Balasubrahmanyam)

References

External links 
 

1970s Telugu-language films
1977 films
Films scored by M. S. Viswanathan
Indian black-and-white films
Telugu remakes of Malayalam films